Thamnomyces is a genus of fungi in the family Xylariaceae. First described by German botanist Christian Gottfried Ehrenberg in 1820, as of 2008, the genus contains four or five species.

References

External links 

Thamnomyces at Index Fungorum

Xylariales
Ascomycota genera
Taxa named by Christian Gottfried Ehrenberg